Manresa was a restaurant in Los Gatos, California that specialized in California cuisine. It was founded in 2002 by chef David Kinch. The Michelin Guide: San Francisco, Bay Area and Wine Country conferred two Michelin stars on the restaurant in 2007, and upgraded it to three stars in 2016.

The San Francisco Chronicle rated the restaurant four stars in 2015. In 2012, Forbes rated Manresa the best restaurant in the United States. The restaurant was also a finalist in the 2014 James Beard Foundation Award for Outstanding Restaurant.

In November 2022, Kinch announced Manresa's closure with its final day being December 31 of that year.

See also
 List of Michelin starred restaurants in the San Francisco Bay Area
 List of Michelin 3-star restaurants
 List of Michelin 3-star restaurants in the United States

References

External links
 

Restaurants in the San Francisco Bay Area
Michelin Guide starred restaurants in California
Molecular gastronomy
Los Gatos, California
Restaurants established in 2002
2002 establishments in California
2022 disestablishments in California